Vilampatti is a small village located in the Virudhunagar district, Tamil Nadu, India. It is located 5 kilometres from Sivakasi. The total population is around 4000. 

There are schools, Hindu temples, match factories and fireworks depots here. The main economy of the people is agriculture. The schools are Nadar George Primary School, A.V.M. MariMuthu Nadar Higher Secondary School, and Periya Karuppa Nadar Thillaiyammal Matriculation. There are three famous temples - Vilampatti Kali Amman Temple, Perumal koil, Sri Pavoor Vinayagar Temple, and Mariamman Temple. The Aadi Festival is famous and lasts six days.

Villages in Virudhunagar district